Troost Avenue is one of the major streets in Kansas City, Missouri and the Kansas City metropolitan area. It is 10.7 miles long, from the north point at 4th Street to the south point at Bannister Road.

History
The street is named after the first physician to reside in Kansas City, Dr. Benoist Troost. He was born November 17, 1786 in Holland and moved to the United States in 1815, settling in Independence, Missouri in 1844. Troost Avenue was continuously developed from 1834 into the 1990s, including movie theaters and apartments. After the Town of Kansas (which is now the city of Kansas City, Missouri) was established in 1850, Dr. Troost became one of the governing trustees. In the 1850s, he was involved in publishing the first newspaper, the Kansas City Enterprise. He was one of the originators of the first Chamber of Commerce in 1857.

Troost Avenue has historically served as a dividing line of racist segregation and disinvestment in Kansas City, with more white residents living west of Troost and more black residents living to the east. For decades, this line was legally enforced under Jim Crow laws, which had been templated after the neighborhood system of house deed covenants blocking homeownership or occupancy by Blacks and Jews, which had been written by Kansas City real estate developer J.C. Nichols.

Deed Restrictions 
Just as Nichols selected each architectural and landscaping element of his subdivisions to reflect picturesque suburban ideals, he only sold properties to the type of resident that he believed suited his bucolic vision.  Deed restrictions are, at their core, simply contracts covering conditions that restrict property use or sale. These restrictions can cover things like the placement of buildings, the type of architecture used, or the placement of utility easements. More significantly, these restrictions forbade African Americans from owning or renting any property in the area. In 1912, a J.C. Nichols Co. sign at 52nd Street and Brookside Boulevard advertises property in the Country Club District as “high class residence property.” 

Nichols believed that residential neighborhoods should “plan for permanence” by controlling the character of development, providing neighborhood amenities, and utilizing deed restrictions. Nichols said, “Let us build enduring homes and neighborhoods; permanent business, commercial and industrial areas with lasting values, all planned for a century or more."  A part of his plan to create permanence was to allow people to have adequate space and access to utilize the area. However, it shows that, despite this, not everyone had adequate access.

The J.C. Nichols Company was among the first and highest profile organizations to encourage the use of racially restrictive covenants, which ultimately influenced racial population patterns nationally. Nichols was also instrumental in the emerging system of urban planning and regulation of private and use that is central to today’s real estate industry. His belief was that residential developments should be regulated for cost efficiency, transportation accessibility, and stability. Section 6 in the J.C. Nichols Investment Co. Restriction Deed of 1933 states, “None of the lots hereby restricted may be conveyed to, used, owned, nor occupied by negroes as owners or tenants.” Nichols’ restriction covenants would later become the model adopted by other states to implement similar policies. Ultimately, the 1948 Supreme Court decision Shelly v. Kraemer made such covenants unenforceable. However, covenants remained the same for J.C. for decades after the Supreme Court decision because it was difficult to change what he had enforced. Nichols made the restrictions in his neighborhood renew automatically every 20 to 25 years unless many of the homeowners agree to change them with notarized votes. While the covenants are unenforceable today, their impact remains.

The Dividing Line 
Perhaps no city in America has a more stark physical and symbolic division than Troost Avenue. In Sherry Lamb Schirmer’s book, A City Divided, she writes that the 1920s brought a widespread concern among whites and property values. African Americans were to stay on the East side of Troost to prevent “tainting” the neighborhoods and shopping centers that J.C. Nichols developed. This dividing line would remain engrained in Kansas City’s structure for decades as a 2018 article in the Kansas City Star reported that neighborhoods west of Troost are white and neighborhoods east of Troost are black. In his book, Some of My Best Friends are Black, Tanner Colby argues that Nichols orchestrated a "white flight" of sorts from the east side to his developments west of Troost by inducing "panic-selling" and blockbusting.

Points of interest
 City Union Mission is located at 10th and Troost and its administrative office is located at 11th & Troost.
 Greyhound Bus Station is located at 1101 Troost.
 Manual Career & Technical Center is located near Truman Road and Troost.
 Kansas City Area Transportation Authority (RideKC) is located near 18th and Troost.
 Kansas City, Missouri Health Department is located at 2400 Troost.
 Kansas City Public Schools Board of Education is located at 2901 Troost.
 Operation Breakthrough is located at 3039 Troost.
 Kansas City Police Department - Central Patrol is located near Linwood Boulevard.
 DeLaSalle High School is located at 3737 Troost.
 39th and Troost MetroCenter.
 Bishop Sullivan Center is located at 3936 Troost.
 Community LINC is located at 4012 and 4014 Troost.
 Cleaver II Blvd Shoppes is located at Emanuel Cleaver II Boulevard/47th St and Troost.
 Anita B. Gorman Conservation Discovery Center is located at 4750 Troost.
 Brush Creek is located at Volker Boulevard and Troost.
 Stowers Institute for Medical Research is located at 50th and Troost.
 University of Missouri–Kansas City is located between 50th and 55th Streets along Troost.
 Rockhurst University is located between 52nd and 55th Streets along Troost.
 St. Francis Xavier Catholic Church is located at 52nd and Troost.
 Rockhurst University Community Center is located at 5401 Troost.
 Troost Elementary School is located near 59th and Troost.
 The Landing Mall is located at 63rd and Troost.
 Forest Hill & Calvary Cemetery is located at 6901 Troost.
 75th and Troost MetroCenter.
 Route 25 - Troost is a city transportation bus route.
 Troost Avenue MAX Line is a bus rapid transit route.

References

External links
 Troost Market Collective and Troostapalooza
 Troost Avenue Festival
 Troost Avenue: A Study in Community Building
 We Are Superman: The Transformation of 31st & Troost

Transportation in Kansas City, Missouri
Streets in Kansas City, Missouri